College of Performing Arts may refer to:

Chicago
 Chicago College of Performing Arts, Roosevelt University in Chicago, Illinois
 The Music Conservatory of Chicago College of Performing Arts
 The Theatre Conservatory of Chicago College of Performing Arts, Roosevelt University in Chicago, Illinois

Elsewhere
 National Taiwan College of Performing Arts, Neihu, Taipei, Taiwan
 The New School College of Performing Arts, New York
 Stella Mann College of Performing Arts, Bedford, Bedfordshire, England
 Talkington College of Visual & Performing Arts, Texas Tech University in Lubbock, Texas